Wang Keying (born December 1937) is a People's Republic of China politician. He was born in Linxiang, Hunan. He graduated from the Huazhong University of Science and Technology.

Wang was the Mayor of Changsha from 1985 to 1990 and CPPCC Committee Chairman of Hunan from 2001 to 2003.

References

1937 births
People's Republic of China politicians from Hunan
Chinese Communist Party politicians from Hunan
Mayors of Changsha
Vice-governors of Hunan
Huazhong University of Science and Technology alumni
Living people
Politicians from Yueyang